Sergey Betov and Alexander Bury were the defending champions, but chose not to participate together. Bury played alongside Anton Zaitcev, but lost to Aldin Šetkić and Boy Westerhof in the quarterfinals.

Betov competed with Michail Elgin and retain the title, defeating Laslo Djere and Peđa Krstin in the final, 6–4, 6–3.

Seeds

Draw

References
 Main Draw

Samarkand Challenger - Doubles
2015 Doubles